George Waterhouse may refer to:

George Robert Waterhouse (1810–1888), British naturalist
George Waterhouse (politician) (1824–1906), Premier of South Australia and Premier of New Zealand
George Waterhouse (footballer) (1899–1931), Australian rules footballer